River Heads is a coastal town and locality in the Fraser Coast Region, Queensland, Australia.

Geography 
The town is built on a narrow peninsula surrounded by the Great Sandy Strait (to the east), the mouth of the Mary River (south) and the mouth of the Susan River (a tributary of the Mary) to the west.

History 
River Heads was originally called Bingham, but was renamed on 22 November 1986.

Bingham State School opened on 10 May 1915 (probably then known as Mary River Heads Provisional School). It closed on 5 September 1926.

Transport 
Vehicular ferries linking the mainland with Wanggoolba Creek and Kingfisher Bay Resort on Fraser Island depart from River Heads.  The journey to Fraser Island takes 45 minutes.

References

External links

 Town map of River Heads (southern section), 1983
 Town map of River Heads (northern section), 1983

Towns in Queensland
Coastal towns in Queensland
Wide Bay–Burnett
Fraser Coast Region
Localities in Queensland